Enrico Leide (May 24, 1887 – July 18, 1970) was a concert cellist and orchestra conductor, conducting the first Atlanta Symphony Orchestra from 1920 to 1930. He was also music director of the palatial Paramount Theater in Atlanta upon its opening in 1920. He was the brother of violinist and composer Manoah Leide-Tedesco. He was the third husband of Lucy Beall Candler Owens Heinz Leide (1883-1962), daughter of Coca-Cola founder Asa Griggs Candler.

External links
 Photo at Atlanta History Center site

References

1887 births
1970 deaths
American male conductors (music)
American cellists
Italian conductors (music)
Italian male conductors (music)
Italian cellists
Druid Hills, Georgia
Italian emigrants to the United States
20th-century Italian Jews
Candler family
20th-century American conductors (music)
20th-century Italian male musicians
20th-century cellists